Rowley Regis and Tipton was a parliamentary constituency centred on the towns of Rowley Regis and Tipton in Staffordshire (now West Midlands). The Rowley Regis section of the constituency was in Worcestershire from 1966 until 1974, as was the Tividale area (originally in the borough of Dudley before those dates.

It returned one Member of Parliament (MP) to the House of Commons of the Parliament of the United Kingdom.

The constituency was created for the 1950 general election, and abolished for the February 1974 general election, with the Tipton area being incorporated into West Bromwich West and the Rowley Regis area being incorporated into Warley West. It was held by Labour for all 24 years of its existence.

Boundaries 
The Municipal Boroughs of Rowley Regis and Tipton.

Members of Parliament

Elections

Elections in the 1950s

Elections in the 1960s

Elections in the 1970s

References 

Parliamentary constituencies in the West Midlands (county) (historic)
Parliamentary constituencies in Staffordshire (historic)
Constituencies of the Parliament of the United Kingdom established in 1950
Constituencies of the Parliament of the United Kingdom disestablished in 1974